Agyneta affinis is a species of sheet weaver found in the Palearctic. It was described by Kulczynski in 1898.

References

affinis
Palearctic spiders
Spiders described in 1898